WICR (88.7 FM) is a public radio station in Indianapolis, Indiana.  It is owned by the University of Indianapolis and broadcasts a non-commercial jazz and classical music radio format.  The license is held by the University of Indianapolis Board of Trustees.  On weekdays, classical music is heard from midnight to noon, while jazz is heard afternoons and evenings.  On weekends, the station programs a mix of jazz, classical and other musical genres.  The radio studios and offices are in Esch Hall on East Hanna Avenue.

WICR has an effective radiated power (ERP) of 8,000 watts.  The transmitter is on Walnut Street near 79th Street, amid the towers for other Indianapolis-area FM and TV stations.  WICR operates using HD Radio technology.  The HD-2 digital subchannel is a reverse of the usual weekday programming, where jazz music plays overnight and in the morning, while classical music is heard afternoons and evenings.  WICR also operates a Top 40/CHR station, WICR-HD3, known as UIndy Radio.  In addition, the station streams its programming online.

History
On , the station first signed on the air.  The call sign represents the original name of the school, Indiana Central University Radio.  At first, WICR was powered at 10 watts, only able to cover the campus and a few adjacent neighborhoods.  Dean Ransburg was the chairman of the school's radio committee and Phillip C. Roberts served as the general manager.  In that era, Barbara Benn was a rare female program director.  The station aired a mix of classical, jazz and educational programs as well as student free form rock shows.

Over time, the power was increased and WICR's transmitter was relocated to one of the highest points in Indianapolis.  In 2004, the station began broadcasting using HD Radio technology.   WICR is a student-operated radio station overseen by full-time university faculty/staff as well as a student management team.  Students enrolled in the Applied Radio course at the university are responsible for weekly shifts, producing shows, sports broadcasting, and updating the web site and social media.

Signal coverage
The station's main signal extends from northern Monroe County, to parts of Columbus, Muncie and West Lafayette, and in some parts of Marion, Indiana.

Programming
WICR features classical music and jazz programming. The weekday schedule consists of classical music overnight and in the morning hours, with jazz in the afternoon and evening. University of Indianapolis students are on the air during the jazz programming. Classical music programming on the station is supplied by locally-based non-profit Classical Music Indy and national syndicators.  

The station also features locally-produced music, arts, and community programs, as well as sports.  WICR broadcasts all University of Indianapolis football and basketball games, either on 88.7 FM or on wicronline.org

Events
WICR is involved in a number of events throughout the year. Several weeks during the fall and spring, WICR conducts a listener fundraising drive to help support the station's operations. In the spring, WICR also hosts a jazz festival on the University of Indianapolis campus. During the fall, WICR has a large presence at Indy Jazz Fest, an annual festival held in Indianapolis.  WICR also participates in various other jazz festivals and concerts held around the city during the summer.

References

External links
WICR official website
Classical Music Indy website

ICR
Classical music radio stations in the United States
Jazz radio stations in the United States
ICR
University of Indianapolis
Radio stations established in 1962